Antonio de Salazar (or Zalazar) (c.1650–1715) was a Novohispano composer.

Salazar was born in Puebla de los Angeles, current Mexico. In 1698 he turned into the master of the chapel of Puebla Puebla Cathedral, then later held his final position at Mexico City Cathedral. It is unknown if he had any direct connection to Oaxaca Cathedral though some of his compositions are found in manuscript there.  He died in Mexico City, Viceroyalty of New Spain, current Mexico.

In his sacred Latin works Salazar was noted for a strict contrapuntal style harking back to Palestrina. The musicologist Bruno Turner considers that Salazar "represents the last of the truly conservative Hispanic composers before the all-conquering Italian style took Spain and its Empire by storm".

Salazar also composed lighter pieces including Christmas villancicos, including several in the negrillo genre imitating the dialects and dances of African slaves.

Works
Motets
 Credidi quod locutus sum
 O sacrum convivium
 Joseph fili David
 Gloriosa virginum
 Te Joseph celebrent
 Vexilla Regis prodeunt

Villancicos
 Tarará tarará qui yo soy Antoniyo

References

Links
 Free scores by Antonio de Salazar in the Choral Public Domain Library (ChoralWiki)

Spanish Baroque composers
1650s births
1715 deaths
Mexican classical composers
Mexican male classical composers
18th-century classical composers
18th-century male musicians
Spanish male musicians